The 1934 United States Senate election in Virginia was held on November 6, 1934. Incumbent Senator Harry F. Byrd, Sr. was re-elected to his first full (and his second overall) term after defeating Republican Lawrence C. Page in a landslide.

Results

References

Virginia
1934
United States Senate